Jonas Svensson was the defending champion but lost in the quarterfinals to Horst Skoff.

Skoff won in the final 4–6, 6–3, 6–4, 6–2 against Thomas Muster.

Seeds

  Thomas Muster (final)
  Jonas Svensson (quarterfinals)
  Andrei Chesnokov (semifinals)
  Kevin Curren (semifinals)
  Magnus Gustafsson (second round)
  Michiel Schapers (quarterfinals)
  Sergio Casal (semifinals)
  Marián Vajda (quarterfinals)

Draw

Final

Section 1

Section 2

External links
 1988 CA-TennisTrophy draw

Singles